Kyle Vantrease (born August 20) is an American football quarterback for the Georgia Southern Eagles.

Early years
Vantrease attended Stow–Munroe Falls High School in Stow, Ohio.

College football

Buffalo
Vantreaase began his college career at the University at Buffalo, playing for the Bulls football team from 2017 to 2021. He passed for 1,193 yards in 2019, 1,325 yards in 2020, and 1,861 yards in 2021. In addition to playing quarterback, Vantrease served as Buffalo's primary punter for three games in the 2019 season after Buffalo's starting punter suffered a season-ending injury in the second game of the season. In December 2021, he entered the NCAA transfer portal.

Georgia Southern
In 2022, Vantrease transferred to Georgia Southern.  In his second game for Georgia Southern, he won Sunbelt Conference player of the week honors after passing for 409 yards and leading the team to a 45-42 upset victory over Nebraska. On October 15, he completed 38 of 64 passes for a school-record 578 yards against James Madison. Through games played on November 19, he ranked fourth among Division I FBS leaders with 3,512 passing yards.

Statistics

References

Living people
People from Stow, Ohio
Players of American football from Ohio
American football quarterbacks
Buffalo Bulls football players
Georgia Southern Eagles football players
Year of birth missing (living people)